Józef Olejniczak (22 February 1963 – 13 March 2001) was a motorcycle speedway rider from Poland. He was the 1950 Polish champion.

Career 
Olejniczak became the champion of Poland after he won gold at the Polish Individual Speedway Championship in 1950, during the 1950 Polish speedway season.

From 1949 to 1954, he won six consecutive Team Speedway Polish Championships, as part of the Unia Leszno team that dominated the Polish leagues from the 1949 Polish speedway season, through to the 1954 Polish speedway season. The Leszno team included riders such as Alfred Smoczyk, Jan Malinowski and Henryk Żyto.

References 

1918 births
2001 deaths
Polish speedway riders